The Information Retrieval Specialist Group (IRSG) or BCS-IRSG is a Specialist Group of the British Computer Society concerned with supporting communication between researchers and practitioners, promoting the use of Information Retrieval (IR) methods in industry and raising public awareness. There is a newsletter called The Informer, the annual European Conference on Information Retrieval (ECIR), an annual event called Search Solutions aimed at researchers and practitioners, and continual organisation and sponsorship of conferences, workshops and seminars. The current chair is Professor Udo Kruschwitz.

European Conference on Information Retrieval
Organising ECIR is one of the major activities of the Information Retrieval Specialist Group. The conference began in 1979 and has grown to become one of the major Information Retrieval conferences alongside SIGIR receiving hundreds of paper and poster submissions every year from around the world. ECIR was initially established by the IRSG under the name "Annual Colloquium on Information Retrieval Research", and held in the UK until 1997. It was renamed ECIR in 2003 to better reflect its status as an international conference. ECIR is currently ranked A in the CORE conference rankings.

References

External links 
 IRSG website

Information retrieval organizations
BCS Specialist Groups
Organizations established in 1979